Høylandet is the administrative centre of Høylandet municipality in Trøndelag county, Norway. The Norwegian County Road 17 runs through Høylandet. Høylandet Church is located on the north side of the village.

Name
The name of the village (and municipality) comes from the Old Norse form of the name: Høylandir. The first element is høy which means "hay" and the last element is the plural form of land which means "land" or "region". The name was historically spelled Hølandet.

References

Villages in Trøndelag
Høylandet